Gerard Spaink (13 October 1928 in Amsterdam - 2005) was a Dutch malacologist.

Taxa described 
 Spisula hartingi Spaink, 1958 - n. sp. 
 Divaricella juttingae Spaink, 1965 - n. sp.
 Astarte omalii peelensis Spaink, 1968 - n. ssp.
 Architectonica neerlandica Spaink, 1968 - n. sp.
 Chrysallida andersoni Spaink, 1968 - n. sp.
 Astarte alternicostata Spaink, 1972 - n. sp.
 Astarte irregularis Spaink, 1972 - n. sp.
 Astarte omalii latecostata Spaink, 1972 - nomen novum
 Astarte mutabilis altenai Spaink, 1972 - n. ssp.
 Altenaeum nortoni Spaink, 1972 - n. gen, n. sp.
 Astarte neerlandica Spaink, 1974 - nom. nov.
 Crassatella flandrica Spaink, 1978 - n. sp.
 Martesia losserensis Spaink, 1978 - n. sp.
 Nassarius tjoernensis Spaink, 1980 - n. sp.

Bibliography 
Bibliography of Gerard Spaink include:

(incomplete)
  Spaink G. (1952). Zoetwatermollusken. Uitg. Hybicommissie van de Nederlandse Jeugdbond voor Natuurstudie, 20 p.
 Spaink G. (1958) "Spisula hartingi nov. spec., a new bivalve from the Eemian in the Netherlands". Basteria 22(1): 15-17.
  Spaink G. (1958). "De Nederlandse Eemlagen, I: Algemeen Overzicht". Wetenschappelijke Mededelingen K.N.N.V. 29: 44 p.
  Spaink G. (1960). "De afdeling Macro-palaeontologie van de Geologische Dienst". Correspondentieblad van de Nederlandse Malacologische Vereniging 90: 910-912.
 Spaink G. (1965). "Divaricella juttingae nov. spec. from the older Pleistocene of Western Europe". Basteria 29(1-4): 55-60.
  Spaink G. (1965). Eocene fossielen uit de ondergrond van West Zeeuwsch-Vlaanderen. Pl. I. In: F.F.F.E. van Rummelen, Toelichting bij de Geologische Kaart  van Nederland 1 : 50.000. Bladen Zeeuwsch-Vlaanderen West en Oost. - Geologische Stichting. Haarlem, 79 p.
  Spaink G. (1965). Mollusken uit de Formatie van Merksem in Oost Zeeuwsch-Vlaanderen. Pl. II. In: F.F.F.E. van Rummelen, Toelichting bij de Geologische Kaart  van Nederland 1 : 50.000. Bladen Zeeuwsch-Vlaanderen West en Oost. - Geologische Stichting. Haarlem. 79 p.
 Spaink G. & Norton P. E. P. (1967). "The stratigraphical range of Macoma balthica (l.) [Bivalvia, Tellinacea] in Pleistocene of the Netherlands and eastern England". Mededelingen van de Geologische Stichting, N.S. 18: 39-44.
  Spaink G. (1967). Fauna uit de Zanden van Oploo, uit boring 52A/22 (ROD flachbohrung 37)  te Oploo bij 54-58 m. Plaat III en IV. In: J.C. van den Toorn, Toelichting bij de Geologische  Kaart van Nederland 1 : 50.000. Blad Venlo West (52 W). - Geologische Stichting, Haarlem, 162 p.
  Spaink G. (1967). Mollusken uit de Brabantse Leem (Weichselien) van het Peelgebied. Plaat V. In: J.C. van den Toorn, Toelichting bij de Geologische Kaart van Nederland 1 : 50.000. Blad Venlo West (52 W). - Geologische Stichting, Haarlem, 162 p.
  Spaink G. (1968). "Een bijzondere continentale molluskenfauna uit het Oud Pleistoceen uit een kleigroeve tussen Bavel en Dorst nabij Breda". Correspondentieblad van de Nederlandse Malacologische Vereniging 129: 1382-1383.
 Spaink G. (1968). "Astarte omalii peelensis n. ssp., Architectonica neerlandica n.sp. and Chrysallida andersoni n.sp. from the Miocene of the Netherlands and Western Germany". Basteria 32(1-3): 8-12.
 Spaink G. (1972). "Description of some species and subspecies of the genus Astarte from the Neogene of the Netherlands". Basteria 36(1): 21-29.
 Spaink G. (1972). "Altenaeum nortoni nov. gen. nov. spec. (Lamellibranchia: Condylocardiidae) from the Pleistocene of the Southern North Sea Basin". Basteria 36(2-5): 143-148.
 Norton P. E. P. & Spaink G. (1973). "The earliest occurrence of Macoma balthica (L.) as a fossil in the North Sea deposits". Malacologia 14: 33-37.
  Spaink G. (1975). Zonering van het mariene Onder-Pleistoceen en Plioceen op grond van  mollusken-fauna's. Toelichting bij Geologische Overzichtskaarten van Nederland: 118-122 (Rijks Geologische Dienst, Haarlem).
  Spaink G. (1976). Tertiaire Cephalopoda I. Malacologische Opstellen, 19-28 (W. Backhuijs, Rotterdam).
  Spaink G., Römer J. H. & Anderson W. F. (1978). "Het Eoceen in de lokaalmoraine van Losser". N.G.V., Staringia 4: 39 p.
 Jansen J. H. F., Doppert J. W. C., Hoogendoorn-Toering K., Jong J. de & Spaink G. (1979). "Late Pleistocene and Holocene deposits in the Witch and Fladen Ground area, Northern North Sea". Netherlands Journal of Sea Research 13(1): 1-39.
  Gladenkov Yu. B., Norton P. E. P. & Spaink G. (1980). "Verkii Kainozoic Islandii (Stratigrafiya Pliotsena-Pleistotsena i paleontologicheskie kompleksi) [Upper Cenozoic of Iceland (Pliocene-Pleistocene stratigraphy and palaeontological assemblages)]". Acad. Sc. USSR, Transactions 345: 116 p. (in Russian with English summary).
  Spaink G. (1980). Typen en typoiden van Nederlandse Eoceen-fossielen. Grondboor en Hamer, 34(5): 155-176.
 Denys L., Sebbe L., Sliggers B. C., Spaink G., Strijdonck M. van & Verbruggen C. (1983). "Litho- and biostratigraphical study of Quaternary deep marine deposits of the Western Belgian coastal plain. Mollusc investigation". Bulletin van de Belgische Vereniging voor Geologie 92(2): 140-145.

References 

1928 births
2005 deaths
Dutch malacologists
Scientists from Amsterdam
20th-century Dutch zoologists